2012–13 Hong Kong Fourth Division League is the 2nd season, as well as the 1st season after the re-introduction of Hong Kong Fourth Division League, a football league in Hong Kong.

Team review
The 2012–13 season of the Hong Kong Fourth Division League consists of 15 clubs, including 9 teams relegated from 2011–12 Third 'A' Division, 4 teams relegated from 2011–12 Third 'District' Division and 2 newly joined teams.

The detail of the clubs is as follows.

League table

Results table

Fixtures and results

Week 1

Week 2

Week 3

Week 4

Week 5

Week 6

Week 7

Week 8

Week 9

Week 10

Week 11

Week 12

Week 13

Week 14

Week 15

Week 16

Week 17

Week 18

Week 19

Week 20

Week 21

Week 22

Week 23

Week 24

Week 25

Week 26

Week 27

Week 28

Week 29

Week 30

References

4
Hong Kong Fourth Division League seasons